West Central District is a district located in the center of Tainan City, Taiwan. It is home to 76,983 people.

History

The district was founded on 1 January 2004, which merged with West District and Central District.

This district was the capital of Taiwan about 200 years and also the oldest region in Taiwan and can be traced back 300 years.

Administrative divisions
The district consists of Chikan, Junwang, Fahua, Kaishan, Yonghua, Yaowang, Guangxian, Daliang, Xihu, Xixian, Chenghuang, Nanmei, Nanmen, Xiaoximen, Wutiaogang, Duiyue, Qiancao, Fuqian, Nanchang and Xihe Village.

Education
National University of Tainan (Main Campus)
 National Tainan Junior College of Nursing

Tourist attractions
 Beiji Temple
 Bo Yang Museum
 Chih-kan Cultural Area
 Chin Men Theater
 Duiyue Gate
 Five Harbors
 Former Tainan Assembly Hall
 Former Tainan Weather Observatory
 Fort Provintia
 Grand Matsu Temple
 Great South Gate
 Hai'an Road Art Street
 Hayashi Department Store
 Kaiji Wu Temple
 Kongmiao Shopping District
 Koxinga Ancestral Shrine
 Mingshen Garden
 National Museum of Taiwan Literature
 National Tainan Living Arts Center
 Sanguan Temple
 Shenlong Street
 Shuixian Gong Market
 Snail Alley
 State Temple of the Martial God
 Tainan Art Museum
 Tainan Confucian Temple
 Tainan Film Center
 Tainan Judicial Museum
 Tainan Wude Hall
 Tainan Wu Garden
 Taiwan Confucian Temple
 Tang Te-chang Memorial Park
 Temple of the Five Concubines
 Wusheng Night Market
 Yongle Market
 Yeh Shih-tao Literature Memorial Hall

Transportation
The district is served by Provincial Highways 17, 17A, and 20. City Route 182 passes through the district. the Tainan railway station is located nearby.

Notable natives
 Shara Lin, musician, actress, singer, and television host

See also
 Tainan

References

Districts of Tainan